Gmina Świdnica may refer to either of the following rural administrative districts in Poland:
Gmina Świdnica, Lower Silesian Voivodeship
Gmina Świdnica, Lubusz Voivodeship